Cranbrook railway station serves the new town of Cranbrook near Exeter in Devon, England. It is the newest station on the line, having opened in December 2015.

Despite being the closest station to Exeter Airport (2.2 miles away), there is not yet a public transport link between the two, but in 2015 a direct bus route was expected to be introduced after the station's completion, to help improve the town's poor level of bus service.

Construction
The station was originally expected to open in 2013, and the 2014 timetables included an additional two minutes for trains passing the station. However, detailed design of the station began only in summer 2014, and construction started that autumn with opening initially due in spring 2015, but problems with a sewer and railway signalling postponed the opening for a then unknown duration. In August 2015, the opening was announced for October. By October 2015, it transpired that the station would not open until 13 December 2015. The station cost £5m to build.

Facilities 
There is a car park with 150 spaces. The station and its services are operated by South Western Railway. The station is unmanned; however, there is a ticket machine so tickets must be purchased before travel.

Services
Off-peak, all services at Cranbrook are operated by South Western Railway using  and  DMUs.

The typical off-peak service in trains per hour is:
 1 tph to  via 
 1 tph to 

References

External links

Railway stations in Devon
Railway stations opened by Network Rail
Railway stations in Great Britain opened in 2015
Railway stations served by South Western Railway
Railway stations served by Great Western Railway